Events from the year 1514 in France.

Incumbents
 Monarch – Louis XII

Events

Births

Deaths

9 January – Anne of Brittany, Duchess of Brittany (born 1477).

Full date missing
Guillaume Briçonnet, cardinal and statesman (born 1445)
Pierre Desrey, chronicler, historian, genealogist and translator (born c. 1450)

See also

References

1510s in France